The Canton of Séderon is a former canton located in the Department of Drôme, in the Arrondissement of Nyons. It had 2,059 inhabitants (2012). It was disbanded following the French canton reorganisation which came into effect in March 2015. It consisted of 18 communes, which joined the canton of Nyons et Baronnies in 2015.

Composition
It comprised the following communes:

 Aulan
 Ballons
 Barret-de-Lioure
 Eygalayes
 Ferrassières
 Izon-la-Bruisse
 Laborel
 Lachau
 Mévouillon
 Montauban-sur-l'Ouvèze
 Montbrun-les-Bains
 Montfroc
 Montguers
 Reilhanette
 Séderon
 Vers-sur-Méouge
 Villebois-les-Pins
 Villefranche-le-Château

Political history
 1951-1958	M. Maigre	SFIO	
 1958-1964	M. Constantin	Centriste	
 1964-1988	Delphi Andréoléty	SFIO puis PS	
 1988-2001	Michel Cossantelli	DVG puis PS	
 2001-2014	Paul Arnoux	DVG puis PS

See also
Cantons of the Drôme department

References

Former cantons of Drôme
2015 disestablishments in France
States and territories disestablished in 2015